Stan Kitzman is an American politician. He is the member for the 85th district of the Texas House of Representatives.

Life and career
Kitzman graduated from Royal High School and Texas A&M University with a bachelor of science in 1988. He served in the Texas Army National Guard and retired as a staff sergeant after serving 21 years.

In March 2022, Kitzman defeated Fred Roberts and Art Hernandez in the Republican primary election for the 85th district of the Texas House of Representatives. In May 2022, he defeated Phil Stephenson in the Republican primary runoff election.

In November 2022, Kitzman defeated Larry Baggett and Michael Miller in the general election, winning 73 percent of the votes. He succeeded Stephenson. He assumes his office on January 10, 2023.

References

Year of birth missing (living people)
Living people
21st-century American politicians
Place of birth missing (living people)
Republican Party members of the Texas House of Representatives
Texas A&M University alumni
Texas National Guard personnel
United States Army non-commissioned officers